Fort Borstal was built as an afterthought from the 1859 Royal Commission on the Defence of the United Kingdom, by convict labour. Construction started in 1875 but was suspended in 1885. The fort was completed around 1895. it was one of a series of four forts that ringed Chatham.

Fort Borstal was designed to hold the high ground southwest of Rochester, South East England. It is of polygonal design and was not originally armed. An anti-aircraft battery was based there in the Second World War.

A  gauge railway was built connecting the four Chatham ring forts of Borstal, Bridgewoods, Horstead and Luton. A rope-worked incline led west from Fort Borstal down to a gravel pit and wharf on the River Medway. About  of track remains intact at Fort Borstal.

After many years' use as a pig farm and store for the nearby Young Offenders Institution it was sold in 1991 to a company hoping to make it a museum, but that proved unsuccessful and the fort has been converted into living accommodation. There is no public access to the site.

References

Bibliography
Out Of The Shadows, A History Of Borstal Village, by Stephen Hannington, 2015. ISBN 978-0-9564677-7-5

External links
Victorian Forts data sheet

Palmerston Forts
18 in gauge railways in England
Military railways in the United Kingdom
Forts in Medway